Gallinago is a genus of birds in the wader family Scolopacidae, containing 18 species.

Taxonomy
The name Gallinago was introduced by the French zoologist Mathurin Jacques Brisson in 1760 as a subdivision of the genus Scolopax. Brisson did not use Carl Linnaeus's binomial system of nomenclature and although many of Brisson's genera had been adopted by ornithologists, his subdivision of genera were generally ignored. Instead, the erection of the genus Gallinago for the snipes was credited to the German zoologist Carl Ludwig Koch in a book published in 1816. But in 1920 it was discovered that the German naturalist Johann Samuel Traugott Frenzel had erected the genus Capella for the snipes in 1801. As his publication predated Koch's use of Gallinago it took precedence. The American Ornithologists' Union switched to Capella in 1921 and in 1934 the American ornithologist James L. Peters used Capella for the woodcocks in his influential Check-list of Birds of the World. This all changed in 1956 when the International Commission on Zoological Nomenclature ruled that Gallinago Brisson 1760 should have priority for the genus with the common snipe as the type species.  The scientific name gallinago is New Latin for a woodcock or snipe from Latin gallina, "hen" and the suffix -ago, "resembling".

The genus contains 18 species:
 Solitary snipe, Gallinago solitaria
 Latham's snipe, Gallinago hardwickii
 Wood snipe, Gallinago nemoricola
 Pin-tailed snipe, Gallinago stenura
 Swinhoe's snipe, Gallinago megala
 African snipe, Gallinago nigripennis
 Madagascar snipe, Gallinago macrodactyla
Magellanic snipe, Gallinago magellanica
 Great snipe, Gallinago media
 Common snipe, Gallinago gallinago
 Wilson's snipe, Gallinago delicata
 Pantanal snipe, Gallinago paraguaiae
 Puna snipe, Gallinago andina
 Noble snipe, Gallinago nobilis
 Giant snipe, Gallinago undulata
 Fuegian snipe, Gallinago stricklandii
 Jameson's snipe, Gallinago jamesoni
 Imperial snipe, Gallinago imperialis

This genus contains the majority of the world's snipe species, the other two extant genera being Coenocorypha, with three species, and Lymnocryptes, the jack snipe. Morphologically, they are all similar, with a very long slender bill and cryptic plumage.  Most have distinctive displays, usually given at dawn or dusk. They search for invertebrates in the mud with a "sewing-machine" action of their long bills.

Fossil bones of some undescribed Gallinago species most similar to the great snipe have been recovered in Late Miocene or Early Pliocene deposits (c. 5 mya) of Lee Creek Mine, USA. The large West Indian species Gallinago kakuki went extinct during the late Quaternary period, and despite its distribution may actually be more closely related to Old World snipe species than New World ones.

References

 
Bird genera